The French Individual Speedway Championship is a Motorcycle speedway championship held each year to determine the French national champion. It was first staged in 1928.

Winners

References

France